Khushk (Khushak, Khoshk, Khushik, Khushuk Koshk or  Kushk | lit: Dry) is a Baloch tribe located in Sindh, Baluchistan and Punjab provinces of Pakistan. It is a branch of Rind and are said to be descendants of Mir Chakar Khan.

See also 
List of Baloch Tribes

References 

 The Castes, Tribes and Nations living in Sindh (in Sindhi Language) by Ayaz 
 Searchlights on Baloches and Balochistan by Mir Khuda Bakhsh Marri
 Note on the Baloch and Birahoi Tribes by S. Sadik Ali
 Encyclopedia Sindhiana, Volume 4, by Prof. Dr. Fahmida Hussain

Baloch tribes